Otovice is a municipality and village in Náchod District in the Hradec Králové Region of the Czech Republic. It has about 300 inhabitants. It is located on the border with Poland.

References

Villages in Náchod District